Qwest or Qwest Communications International, Inc. is a former US telecommunications carrier purchased by CenturyLink in 2011.

Qwest may refer to:

 Qwest Corporation, the single Bell Operating Company of CenturyLink
 Qwest Arena, former name of an arena in Idaho that is home to the Idaho Steelheads and the Idaho Stampede
 Qwest Center Omaha, former name an arena in Omaha that is home to the Creighton Bluejays and the UNO Mavericks
 Qwest Field, former name a stadium in Seattle home to the Seattle Seahawks and Seattle Sounders
 Qwest Records, a record label founded by Quincy Jones in 1980

See also
 Quest (disambiguation)